Salboni Assembly constituency is an assembly constituency in Paschim Medinipur district in the Indian state of West Bengal.

Overview
As per orders of the Delimitation Commission, No. 234 Salboni Assembly constituency  is composed of the following: Bhimpur, Bishnupur, Debgram, Lalgeria and Shalboni gram panchayats of Salboni community development block, Goaltor, Gohaldanga, Jeerapara, Makli, Patharpara and Pingbani gram panchayats of Garhbeta II community development block, and Garhbeta III community development block.

Salboni Assembly constituency is part of No. 33 Jhargram (Lok Sabha constituency) (ST).

Election results

2021
In the 2021 election, Srikanta Mahata of Trinamool Congress defeated his nearest rival, Rajib Kundu of BJP.

2016
In the 2016 election, Srikanta Mahata of Trinamool Congress defeated his nearest rival, Shyam Sundar Pandey of CPI(M).

2011
In the 2011 election, Srikanta Mahata of Trinamool Congress defeated his nearest rival Abhiram mahato of CPI(M).

1977-2006
In the 2006, 2001 and 1996 state assembly elections, Khagendranath Mahata of CPI(M) won the Salboni assembly seat defeating his nearest rivals, Uttara Singha (Hazra) of Trinamool Congress in 2006, Dinen Roy of Trinamool Congress in 2001, and Tapas Das of Jharkhand Party (Naren) in 1996. Contests in most years were multi cornered but only winners and runners are being mentioned. Sundar Hazra of CPI(M) defeated Bijoy Mahata of Janata Party in 1991, Basanti Mahata of Congress in 1987, Kali Sadhan Mahata of Congress in 1982, and Basanti Mahata of Congress in 1977.

1951-1972
Thakurdas Mahata of CPI won in 1972. Sundar Hazra of CPI(M) won in 1971. Amulya Ratan Mahata of Bangla Congress won in 1969 and 1967. Niranjan Khamrai of Congress won in 1962. The Salboni seat did not exist in 1957. In independent India's first election in 1951, Bejoy Gopal Goswami, Independent, won the Salboni seat.

References

Assembly constituencies of West Bengal
Politics of Paschim Medinipur district